Brickellia viejensis is a North American species of flowering plants in the family Asteraceae. It is native to the Sierra Tierra Vieja in Presidio County, western Texas.

Brickellia viejensis is a perennial herb up to 60 cm (24 inches) tall.

References

viejensis
Flora of Texas
Plants described in 1968